Ten Tiny Love Stories is a 2001 drama film directed by Rodrigo García and starring Lisa Gay Hamilton and Radha Mitchell. The film is a series of ten monologues about love in its different forms.

Cast
 Lisa Gay Hamilton as "Three"
 Radha Mitchell as "One"
 Alicia Witt as "Two"
 Deborah Kara Unger as "Seven"
 Rebecca Tilney as "Four"
 Kimberly Williams-Paisley as "Five"
 Susan Traylor as "Eight"
 Elizabeth Peña as "Nine"
 Debi Mazar as "Six"
 Kathy Baker as "Ten"

References

External links

2001 films
Films directed by Rodrigo García
2001 drama films
2000s English-language films